Anjori Alagh is a former Indian actress and model. She is the daughter of actress Maya Alagh and Sunil Alagh. She made her first appearance at the age of 4 in an advertisement. Her debut film was Vikram Bhatt's Life Mein Kabhie Kabhiee (2007). She is a trained Kathak dancer.

Background
Anjori was born to the Alagh Punjabi family in Ludhiana, Punjab. Her mother, Maya Alagh, is a popular Bollywood character actress, her father, Sunil Alagh, was CEO of Britannia Industries. Anjori also has a sister named Sawari who is married to Sameer Nair (CEO of NDTV).

Career
Anjori Alagh began acting at age four and did a number of advertisements for Maggi and Kodak with Prahlad Kakkar. At age 10, Anjori quit acting to complete her studies. She went to the US to study economics and business management in Ohio. After a summer stint at Stanford Acting School, she completed her studies and returned to India where she trained at the Kishore Namit Kapoor Acting Institute. Her mother guided Anjori early on in her career and introduced her to filmmaker Vikram Bhatt. Anjori made quite an impression on Bhatt and a few months later, Anjori received a call from Bhatt who offered her a role in his movie Life Mein Kabhie Kabhiee. Bhatt was impressed by her performance and cast her again in his next film 1920 in 2008, which was a critical and commercial success at the box office. Anjori has also acted in the NDTV Imagine serial Seeta Aur Geeta.

Filmography

Television

References

External links
 

Actresses from Ludhiana
21st-century Indian actresses
Living people
Female models from Punjab, India
Actresses in Hindi cinema
Actresses in Hindi television
Indian film actresses
Indian television actresses
Year of birth missing (living people)